The Church of St. Patrick is a parish church under the authority of the Roman Catholic Archdiocese of New York, located in Richmondtown, Staten Island, New York City. 

The church was established at the county seat in 1862 as a mission of St. Joseph's, Rossville, becoming the fifth Catholic church on Staten Island. Prior to construction of the church, the Catholic community in the area was served by the founding pastor John Barry, a priest from Rossville, as well as by James Roosevelt Bayley, a future archbishop. The early Romanesque Revival-style building was built in 1862, and a steeple was added in 1898.

St. Patrick's became an independent parish in 1884. During 1914–1922, St. Patrick's established four Staten Island mission churches that grew to become independent parishes: St. Margaret Mary, Our Lady Queen of Peace, St. Clare, and St. Charles. The church was declared an official city landmark by the New York City Landmarks Preservation Commission on February 20, 1968.

See also 
 List of New York City Designated Landmarks in Staten Island

References

External links 
 St. Patrick's Church official website

Roman Catholic churches in Staten Island
Roman Catholic churches completed in 1862
New York City Designated Landmarks in Staten Island
19th-century Roman Catholic church buildings in the United States
Romanesque Revival church buildings in New York City
Religious organizations established in 1862
1862 establishments in New York (state)
Richmondtown, Staten Island